Grace Presbyterian Church of New Zealand  (GPCNZ) is a Presbyterian denomination in New Zealand which was formed in 2002. It currently consists of 21 churches and missions, which are in the process of becoming fully established churches.

Background 
Many members of the GPCNZ are former members who left the Presbyterian Church of Aotearoa New Zealand (PCANZ) as they took a more conservative view of faith and the Bible than other churches in the PCANZ. In practice this means that the GPCNZ holds different views to the PCANZ on the Bible, salvation, the gospel, preaching, homosexuality and the ordination of women. In 1974 the Evangelical Presbyterian Church was founded in Christchurch. In 2000 like minded churches formed Grace Bible Churches. In February, 2003 a fully fledged denomination with common constitution called Grace Presbyterian Church in New Zealand was formed.

Theology 
The Grace Presbyterian Church describes itself as "Presbyterian in government, Calvinist in theology, and Evangelical in spirit." It confesses the truth of the Trinity, the centrality of Jesus, the unconditional and yet particular love of God the Father, and the irresistible calling, present power and ministry of The Holy Spirit.
Grace Presbyterian Church holds to the Westminster Confession of Faith as its official confession of faith.
Grace Presbyterian Church believes in the sovereignty of God and subscribes to the Solas of the Reformation:
 Grace Alone (Sola Gratia)
 Faith Alone (Sola Fide)
 Christ Alone (Solus Christus)
 Scripture Alone (Sola Scriptura)
 God's Glory Alone (Soli Deo Gloria)
The denomination teaches that "the Bible is the inspired Word of God and it contains everything people need to know for salvation".

Church positions on social issues 
Grace Presbyterian Church teaches that homosexual practice is sinful. In relation to abortion, it maintains that the Bible does not distinguish between prenatal and postnatal life.
GPCNZ believes that women are valued members of the church, but that the Biblical scriptures limit the office of pastors and elders only to men.

Each congregation has the right to own and control the property.
Local Churches are represented in the Presbytery and the General Assembly.

Ecumenical relations 
GPCNZ is in the process of forming formal links with the Reformed Churches of New Zealand, the Presbyterian Church of Australia, and the Presbyterian Church in America.
It is a member denomination of the World Reformed Fellowship.

Theological institutions 
GPCNZ does not operate its own theological college, and has approved the courses at the Grace Theological College  as the churches' official training institution in New Zealand. Grace Theological College is a non-denominational institution for leaders of churches in the evangelical and Calvinist tradition. It was established in 1995.

Official website:

Constituent churches

See also
Presbyterian polity

References

External links
The Official Website of Grace Presbyterian Church of New Zealand

Christian organizations established in 2002
Presbyterianism in New Zealand
2002 establishments in New Zealand
Members of the World Reformed Fellowship
Presbyterian denominations established in the 21st century